Mount Chenoua (Berber: Adrar en Cenwa) is a mountain range in northern Algeria. It is located between Cherchell and Tipaza on the Mediterranean coast, just west of Algiers. There are marble quarries on the side of the mountain.

Description
There is a village on that mountain named Chenoua. A majority of its inhabitants speak a Berber language, the Shenwa Berber. According to local tradition the mountain range looks like a reclining pregnant woman from a certain distance.

Mount Chenoua is the site of Assia Djebar's film La Nouba des Femmes du Mont Chenoua. It also features prominently in Albert Camus' posthumously published novel, A Happy Death. There is also a Stone Eagle statue that was built in 1991.

See also
Geography of Algeria yAS

References

Chenoua